Älvsjö AIK FF is a Swedish football club located in Älvsjö within Stockholm Municipality.

Background
Älvsjö AIK was formed on 23 May 1915.  The first and largest section of the newly formed club was football. Other sports played included bandy, ice hockey and floorball.  Älvsjö AIK football section was reconstituted in 1993 to become their own separate club with the name Älvsjö AIK Fotbollsförening.

Since their foundation Älvsjö AIK has participated mainly in the middle and lower divisions of the Swedish football league system.  The club's most successful period was from 1969 until 1974 when they competed in Division 2, which at that time was the second tier of Swedish football. The club currently plays in Division 3 Östra Svealand which is the fifth tier of Swedish football. They play their home matches at the Älvsjö IP in Älvsjö.

Älvsjö AIK FF are affiliated to the Stockholms Fotbollförbund.

The women's soccer team won the Swedish national championship in 1995, 1996, 1997, 1998 and 1999 and the Swedish national cup tournament three times, 1992, 1996 and 1999.

Recent history
In recent seasons Älvsjö AIK FF have competed in the following divisions:

 2018  - Division IV, Stockholm Södra
 2017  - Division IV, Stockholm Södra
 2016  - Division IV, Stockholm Mellersta
 2015  - Division III, Södra Svealand
 2014  – Division III, Östra Svealand
 2013  – Division III, Östra Svealand
 2012	– Division III, Södra Svealand
 2011	– Division III, Södra Svealand
 2010	– Division III, Östra Svealand
 2009	– Division II, Södra Svealand
 2008	– Division II, Östra Svealand
 2008	– Division II, Södra Svealand
 2007	– Division II, Norra Svealand
 2006	– Division II, Norra Svealand
 2005	– Division III, Östra Svealand
 2004	– Division III, Östra Svealand
 2003	– Division III, Östra Svealand
 2002	– Division III, Östra Svealand
 2001	– Division III, Östra Svealand
 2000	– Division IV, Stockholm Södra
 1999	– Division III, Östra Svealand
 1998	– Division II, Östra Svealand
 1997	– Division II, Östra Svealand
 1996	– Division II, Västra Svealand
 1995	– Division II, Östra Svealand
 1994	– Division II, Östra Svealand
 1993	– Division II, Östra Svealand

Attendances

In recent seasons Älvsjö AIK FF have had the following average attendances:

Notable managers
  Sören Åkeby
  Göran Aral
  Thomas Turesson

Footnotes

External links
 Älvsjö AIK FF – Official website
  Älvsjö AIK Facebook

Football clubs in Stockholm
Association football clubs established in 1915
Association football clubs established in 1993
1915 establishments in Sweden
Defunct bandy clubs in Sweden